"Do It Again" is a song performed by American contemporary worship band Elevation Worship. Written by Mack Brock, Chris Brown, Matt Redman and Steven Furtick, the song was released as the first single from their 2017 album There Is a Cloud. It was released to Christian radio on February 23, 2018. The song peaked at No. 6 on the US Hot Christian Songs chart, becoming their second Top 10 single from that chart. It lasted on the charts for 33 weeks, their second longest charting song. The song is played in a B-flat major key, and 172 beats per minute.

Background
The earliest version of "Do It Again" was released on September 9, 2016, as part of the extended play titled Speak Revival. The live version of "Do It Again" was then released on February 17, 2018, during the pre-order period of There Is a Cloud, as the second promotional single of the album. It was recorded during the 12-day "Code Orange Revival" event in September 2016, held by Elevation Church at its Ballantyne campus in Charlotte, North Carolina. "Do It Again" impacted Christian radio on February 23, 2018, with an extended play containing the radio, live, reprise, acoustic and Spanish versions of the song released on the same day.

Writing and development
Worship leaders and songwriters Mack Brock and Chris Brown had an interview with Kevin Davis in Reading, Pennsylvania for a 'Behind the Song' feature published on NewReleaseToday. Mack Brock shared that the song was inspired by a sermon titled "Don't Stop on 6" that Steven Furtick preached at a Hillsong Conference, whereby Matt Redman identified a song concept. Chris Brown, in relation to the song's takeaway message, said "We want people to know that God is faithful."

Music videos
The lyric and acoustic videos of "Do It Again" was published on YouTube on September 30, 2016. The live music video of "Do It Again" which also includes the reprise, recorded at Elevation Church's Ballantyne campus in Charlotte, North Carolina was released on February 24, 2017, through YouTube. The lyric video of the song's Spanish version titled "Lo Harás Otra Vez (Do It Again)" was released on August 21, 2017, via YouTube. The live acoustic performance video of the song was then published on March 1, 2018 via YouTube.

Track listing

Charts

Weekly charts

Year-end charts

Certifications

Release history

References

2016 songs
2018 singles
Elevation Worship songs
Songs written by Steven Furtick